Paris of the Orient may refer to:

 Hanoi
 Ho Chi Minh City
 Manila
 Shanghai

See also
 Paris of the East